Trần Độ (1923–2002) was a Vietnamese politician and Lieutenant General of the People's Army of Vietnam. He was expelled from the Communist Party of Vietnam due to his opposing and critical opinions of the party and the state of Vietnam, particularly during post-Vietnam War.

Biography 
His real name was Tạ Ngọc Phách. He grew up in Thái Bình Province. His father worked for bureau of interpretation in Hanoi, a quite high social status.

In 1939, he became a journalist in Hanoi. He was captured by the French that year but then released due to lack of evidence.

He joined the Communist Party of Vietnam in 1940. At the end of 1941, he was captured again. This time, he was sentenced to 15 years imprison. Late 1941, from Hoa Lo (Hanoi), he was exiled to Sơn La. Here, he was in prison with Lê Đức Thọ, Xuân Thuỷ,... In 1943, on prison move to Côn Đảo, he escaped, continuing revolution activity. He led the protest in and started his military career. He had gone south to join the Central Office for South Vietnam and served as the commander during the Tet Offensive assault upon Saigon.

Activities in military 
1946 - He was a leader of Hanoi in the field of National Defense against the French.

1950 - Major General

1964 - He went to South Viet Nam to set up military for war with Vietnam Republic, being the deputy command-in-chief.

1974 - Lieutenant General

1974 to 1976 - Vice President of Central Commission of Politics.

Reform view 
As a leader of national culture (after the war, he worked in the culture section), he wanted to give it more freedom. He is aware that culture without freedom is dead and culture with only propaganda is also dead. The more control, the more deadly culture is and the rarer valuable masterpiece.

In terms of Communist Party leadership, he said:" I advocate the leadership role of the Party. However, leadership does not mean dictatorship. History shows that every dictatorship will eventually end up in corruption, rotten society and Party itself."

In his opinion, the underlying cause of negative phenomenon in the Party and the society is partly due to the absolute rule of Communist Party.

He insisted that: Communist Party must give up dictator regime, give power to the national assembly, government. There must be laws allowing freedom for a new party, freedom of speech, journalism laws, publishing. Election laws, forgo the decision jusridiction of the Party.

It is this opinion that resulted in his expulsion from the party.

References 

People from Thái Bình province
Vietnamese journalists
Vietnamese dissidents
1923 births
2002 deaths
Members of the National Assembly (Vietnam)
Recipients of the Order of Ho Chi Minh
20th-century journalists
Alternates of the 3rd Central Committee of the Workers' Party of Vietnam
Members of the 3rd Central Committee of the Workers' Party of Vietnam
Members of the 4th Central Committee of the Communist Party of Vietnam
Members of the 5th Central Committee of the Communist Party of Vietnam
Members of the 6th Central Committee of the Communist Party of Vietnam